Aleksandr Alekseyevich Dantsev (born 14 October 1984) is a Russian football coach and a former player who played as a left-back. He is an assistant coach for the Under-21 squad of FC Ural Yekaterinburg.

Career statistics

Club

Notes

External links

1984 births
People from Kamensk-Shakhtinsky
Living people
Russian footballers
Russia under-21 international footballers
Association football midfielders
FC Rostov players
FC Khimki players
FC Luch Vladivostok players
Russian Premier League players
FC Ural Yekaterinburg players
Sportspeople from Rostov Oblast